Pattalam Janaki is a 1977 Indian Malayalam-language film, directed by Crossbelt Mani. The film stars Unnimary, Ravikumar, Sudheer and Vijayalalitha. The film has musical score by K. J. Joy.

Cast
Vincent
Unnimary
Ravikumar
Jayan
Sudheer
Vijayalalitha
Cochin Haneefa

Soundtrack
The music was composed by K. J. Joy with lyrics by Mankombu Gopalakrishnan and Bharanikkavu Sivakumar.

References

1977 films
1970s Malayalam-language films
Films directed by Crossbelt Mani